River is a Canadian drama film, directed by Mark Wihak and released in 2007. The film stars Maya Batten-Young and Adam Budd as Roz and Stan, two young adult artists in Regina, Saskatchewan who meet and become close friends.

The film was shot in 2006, using improvisational techniques of dialogue and character development.

The film premiered in August 2007 at the Montreal World Film Festival. It was subsequently screened at the 2007 Whistler Film Festival, where Batten-Young won the Borsos Competition award for Best Actress in a Canadian Film. At the Canadian Filmmakers' Festival in 2008, the film won the Reel Canadian Indie Award and the award for Best Screenplay, and Budd was named Best Actor.

References

External links

2007 films
2007 drama films
Canadian drama films
English-language Canadian films
Films shot in Saskatchewan
Films set in Saskatchewan
2000s English-language films
2000s Canadian films